The 2006 Dubai 24 Hours was the first running of the event and the first event of what would later become the 24H Series. It was held at the Dubai Autodrome from 11–13 January 2006. The winning car was an A5 class BMW 320i E46 run by Duller Motorsport and shared between Dieter Quester, Hans-Joachim Stuck, Philipp Peter and Toto Wolff.

Result

References

Dubai 24 Hour
Dubai
2006 in Emirati motorsport